This is a list of the gymnasts who represented their country at the 1964 Summer Olympics in Tokyo from 10 to 24 October 1964. Only one discipline, artistic gymnastics, was included in the Games.

Female artistic gymnasts

Male artistic gymnasts

References 

Lists of gymnasts
Gymnastics at the 1964 Summer Olympics